Christmas Caravan is a Christmas album by the swing revival band Squirrel Nut Zippers that was released in 1998 by  Mammoth Records.

Track listing
 "Winter Weather" (Ted Shapiro)  – 2:24
 "Indian Giver" (Jimbo Mathus)  – 3:37
 "A Johnny Ace Christmas" (Tom Maxwell)  – 3:43
 "My Evergreen" (Maxwell)  – 2:35
 "Sleigh Ride" (Leroy Anderson, Mitchell Parish)  – 3:09
 "I'm Coming Home for Christmas" (Manny Cabral, Mathus)  – 3:46
 "Carolina Christmas" (Maxwell, Ken Mosher)  – 1:51
 "Gift of the Magi" (Mathus)  – 3:19
 "Hot Christmas" (Maxwell, Mosher)  – 2:35
 "Hanging Up My Stockings" (Chester Church)  – 7:11

References

Squirrel Nut Zippers albums
1998 Christmas albums
Mammoth Records albums
Christmas albums by American artists
Jazz Christmas albums